H Mart ( or ) is an American supermarket chain of Asian supermarkets operated by the Hanahreum Group, headquartered in  Lyndhurst, Bergen County (버건군), New Jersey. The chain has 84 stores throughout the United States, operated variously as H Mart, H Mart Northwest, and H Mart Colorado; two stores in the Pacific Northwest operate as G Mart. It also has stores in Canada and eight in the United Kingdom, including seven locations of Oseyo. H Mart is the largest U.S.-based grocery store chain that specializes in Asian-style products and caters to Asian-American shoppers.

The "H" in "H Mart" stands for Han Ah Reum (한아름), a Korean phrase meaning "one arm full of groceries". This phrase translates more literally to "spreading both arms to cover" or "armful".

History

The H Mart chain began in 1982 in Woodside, Queens (퀸스), in New York City (뉴욕), as a small corner grocery store. Subsequent H Marts were operated differently from the original one, which maintained the original Han Ah Reum name and signage until it closed in 2020.

United States 

From 1982 to 1991, the company added 10 stores, mostly in the Northeastern United States.

In 1997, the company opened its first store in Falls Church, Virginia, in the Washington-Baltimore metropolitan area. On October 19, 1998, the chain opened its current headquarters in Lyndhurst in Bergen County (버건군), New Jersey, the U.S. county with the highest Korean population percentage, at 6.9%.

In 2004, the first Super H Mart opened in Duluth, Georgia. By 2005, the chain had 17 stores; the following March, 22—all on the East Coast except for two stores in Denver, Colorado. Its first West Coast location, in Federal Way, Washington, opened in April 2006.

After its 2001 opening, an H Mart store in northern Virginia gained many Hispanic American employees. After cultural conflicts between Hispanic and Korean American employees in one store, the H Mart headquarters provided an intercultural training program, with translations in Spanish.

In spring 2017, H Mart opened a 43,000 square-foot store in San Jose, California. In summer 2018, H Mart signed a lease for a 42,000-square-foot store in San Francisco.

As of 2021, there were 84 H Mart stores in the United States, located in New York, New Jersey, Arizona, California, Colorado, Georgia, Hawaii, Illinois, Maryland, Massachusetts, Michigan, North Carolina, Oregon, Pennsylvania, Texas, Virginia, and Washington.

Canada
H Mart began moving into western Canada in December 2003, with its first store in Coquitlam, British Columbia, a West Coast location that opened ahead of stores in Seattle, Los Angeles, and San Francisco. In subsequent years, the company opened stores in Downtown Vancouver and Langley in 2006; Richmond in 2012; and Port Coquitlam in 2016.

In 2013, the company opened its first urban convenience format on Yonge Street and Churchill Avenue in the Toronto-suburb of Willowdale called "M2M–morning to midnight". The two-story,  store is the first one in Canada. There are currently two other M2M stores in the U.S., both in Manhattan (맨해튼). A larger H Mart opened on Yonge Street in Richmond Hill, with another opening in Downtown Toronto across from Ryerson University (now Toronto Metropolitan University) in 2017. In July 2019, an H Mart opened in Edmonton, Alberta, followed by another in Calgary, also in  Alberta, in 2020.

United Kingdom
H Mart Europe Limited was incorporated in 2009, and in 2011, H Mart opened its first store in Europe, in the New Malden area of London. Smaller stores operate as Oseyo.

Controversies 
In 2006, a civil suit was filed against H Mart for discrimination against whites when three tenants of the West Willow Shopping Mall in Willowbrook, Canada, which the company had moved into and then bought, filed a complaint with the British Columbia Human Rights Tribunal alleging that the company wanted to turn it into an Asian-only market. All three tenants made the claim when their leases were not renewed despite being long-term lease holders within the mall. In late 2007, tribunal member Lindsay Lyster dismissed their complaint on the grounds it had no reasonable prospect of success and did not merit a hearing. She wrote:
In the end, I have concluded that the complainants' case is based on little more than conjecture based on what they read in the media and H-Mart's reputation as a "Korean market," as seen through the lens of their own unhappiness in being unable to maintain their businesses in the mall.
In 2012, picketers gathered outside one of the Flushing (플러싱) stores to protest H Mart's hiring practices. Protest organizer Jim MacDonald said the store, and other H Marts nearby, disproportionately hired Asian people and specifically Korean-Americans. H Mart responded in a statement that the company "does not screen employees by race, but by their capabilities"; for example, the Flushing store hires many Korean speakers to better serve its many customers who do not speak English.

In 2013, Korean news agencies and government agencies alleged that H Mart laundered money for former South Korean president Chun Doo Hwan, who was convicted of embezzling hundreds of millions of dollars during his autocratic rule, and his family. In September 2013, Korean news channel TV Chosun reported that "South Korean prosecutors have traced Chun Doo-Hwan's secret funding to H Mart, as they found suspicious money laundering in an account” (translation by Boston Korea, a Boston-based Korean-language news site). Prosecutors also noted bank transfers from Chun's daughter-in-law marked "H Mart investment". H Mart President Kwon Il-Yeon denied the allegations.

See also
 Koreatown
 Flushing, Queens
 Asian supermarket
 Oseyo
 Wing Yip
 Mitsuwa Marketplace
 99 Ranch Market
 Marukai Corporation U.S.A.
 Nijiya Market

References

External links

H Mart (United States) 
H Mart (Pacific Northwest)
H Mart (British Columbia and Alberta) 
H Mart (Greater Toronto Area) 
H Mart (London) 

1982 establishments in New York City
Food manufacturers of the United States
Korean-American culture
Retail companies established in 1982
Supermarkets of the United States